The Escape was a 1914 American silent drama film written and directed by D. W. Griffith and starred Donald Crisp. The film is based on the play of the same name by Paul Armstrong who also wrote the screenplay. It is now considered lost. The master negative of the production was destroyed  in the disastrous 1914 Lubin vault fire in Philadelphia, Pennsylvania.

Cast
 Donald Crisp as Bull McGee
Edna Foster as Crippled Girl
 Earle Foxe
 Robert Harron as Larry Joyce
 Ralph Lewis as The Senator
 Walter Long
 Mae Marsh as Jennie Joyce
 Owen Moore as Doctor von Eiden
 Blanche Sweet as May Joyce
 Fay Tincher as An Adventuress
 F. A. Turner as Jim Joyce
 Tammany Young as McGee's Henchman

Plot
The film begins with a short prologue explaining the science of Eugenics; contrasting the careful selection observed in the animal world with the less predictable breeding habits of humans. This is illustrated by the story of the Joyce family, headed by Jim Joyce (Turner), a cruel and senseless man. Joyce's son Larry (Harron) is by nature a sensitive kid, but Jim Joyce turns him into a heartless monster, strangling a cat as a sort of coming of age ritual.

Larry Joyce contracts a case of syphilis, and seeks out treatment from Doctor Von Eiden (Moore), who also takes a keen interest in Larry's sister May (Sweet). Von Eiden encourages May to make a break with her family, and she succeeds. However she is unable to find employment and enters into a relationship with a wealthy senator (Lewis) as a kept woman. While May will not marry the Senator, her sister Jennie (Marsh) does marry a man named "Bull" McGee (Crisp), an abusive lout just like her father.

Their infant child is killed when McGee trips over its cradle in a drunken stupor, and Jennie becomes delusional, endlessly rocking the cradle with a doll inside. McGee is repulsed by her condition and puts Jennie away quietly through selling her into prostitution. May manages to wrest Jennie away from this peril, but Jennie expires soon after. Von Eiden, however, has managed to restore Larry's original sensitivity through a surgical procedure; May has broken off the relationship with the Senator and agrees to marry Von Eiden.

Historical background and legacy
The Escape was based on a play by Paul Armstrong, a prolific playwright best known for his properties Alias Jimmy Valentine (1910) and Salomy Jane (1907). Griffith's film version was begun first, finished second, but released third among the cycle of five films he made at Reliance-Majestic Studios between his ouster at Biograph Company and the advent of The Birth of a Nation (1915). Filming of The Escape began in New York City, but was completed in Los Angeles partly due to an illness in the cast. There was a long delay in getting it out; although Mutual Film finally released it on June 1, 1914, response to The Escape was of a mixed character and the film was dumped on the States' Rights market by the end of the year. 
          
Lillian Gish recalled The Escape as one of the finest films Griffith ever made, whereas Griffith himself regarded its failure as a momentary distraction during the planning stages of The Birth of a Nation.

Status
Iris Barry first reported The Escape as a lost film in 1940 and despite an international search for Griffith's film output lasting the decades since, The Escape remains one among a small handful of Griffith features that have never been located.

See also
List of lost films

References

External links

1914 films
1914 drama films
Silent American drama films
American silent feature films
American black-and-white films
1910s exploitation films
Films directed by D. W. Griffith
American films based on plays
Films shot in New York City
Films shot in Los Angeles
Lost American films
Eugenics in fiction
1914 lost films
Lost drama films
1910s American films
1910s English-language films